The 1976 Calder Cup playoffs of the American Hockey League began on April 3, 1976. The top three teams from each division qualified for the playoffs. The two division winners earned byes for the Division Semifinals while the other two teams in each division played best-of-five series. The winners played best-of-seven series with the team that received the first round bye in their division. The winners of each Division Final played a best-of-seven series for the Calder Cup. The Calder Cup Final ended on April 28, 1976, with the Nova Scotia Voyageurs defeating the Hershey Bears four games to one to win the Calder Cup for the second time in team history. Coincidentally, the Voyageurs parent club, the Montreal Canadiens won the Stanley Cup in a four-game sweep over the Philadelphia Flyers, making them the first pair of teams in history to win both the AHL's Calder Cup and NHL's Stanley Cup in the same season. Even more impressive is that these same two teams would accomplish this feat again the following year.

Playoff seeds
After the 1975–76 AHL regular season, the top three teams from each division qualified for the playoffs. The Nova Scotia Voyageurs finished the regular season with the best overall record. The two division champions earned byes to the Division Finals.

Northern Division
Nova Scotia Voyageurs - 104 points
Rochester Americans - 93 points
Providence Reds - 76 points

Southern Division
Hershey Bears - 84 points
Richmond Robins - 66 points
New Haven Nighthawks - 66 points

Bracket

In each round, the team that earned more points during the regular season receives home ice advantage, meaning they receive the "extra" game on home-ice if the series reaches the maximum number of games. There is no set series format due to arena scheduling conflicts and travel considerations.

Division Semifinals 
Note: Home team is listed first.

Byes
Nova Scotia Voyageurs (Northern Division regular-season champions)
Hershey Bears (Southern Division regular-season champions)

Northern Division

(2) Rochester Americans vs. (3) Providence Reds

Southern Division

(2) Richmond Robins vs. (3) New Haven Nighthawks

Division Finals

Northern Division

(1) Nova Scotia Voyageurs vs. (2) Rochester Americans

Southern Division

(1) Hershey Bears vs. (2) Richmond Robins

Calder Cup Final

(N1) Nova Scotia Voyageurs vs. (S1) Hershey Bears

See also
1975–76 AHL season
List of AHL seasons

References

Calder Cup
Calder Cup playoffs